Admiral Sir William Frederic Wake-Walker KCB CBE (24 March 1888 – 24 September 1945) was a British admiral who served in the Royal Navy during World War I and World War II, taking a leading part in the destruction of the , and in Operation Dynamo, the evacuation at Dunkirk.

Early life and education
Born William Frederic Wake-Walker, he was the son of Frederic George Arthur Wake-Walker and Mary Eleanor Forster and the grandson of Admiral Sir Baldwin Wake Walker, who was Surveyor of the Navy from 1848 to 1861.

After attending Haileybury school, Wake-Walker entered the Royal Naval College at Dartmouth as a cadet in 1903, and went to sea the following year as midshipman aboard , the flagship of the 1st Cruiser Squadron.

World War I

Inter-war years

Commands and promotions 
Wake-Walker was promoted to commander in June 1920, serving aboard  from 1919 to 1921. Between 1921 and 1925 he served at the Royal Naval College, Greenwich, then at the Tactical School, Portsmouth. Wake-Walker achieved flag rank on 10 January 1939.

Liability for the collision between HMS Dragon and Maplebranch 

On 13 August 1934, Dragon under Wake-Walker's command was entering the Market (or Victoria) Basin in the harbour of Montreal, Quebec, Canada, when the ship collided with an oil bunkering steamer, Maplebranch, which was securely moored at the time of the collision. Maplebranch sank. The steamer's owners sued Wake-Walker for the damages to Maplebranch and its cargo, alleged to have been caused solely by the improper and negligent navigation and mismanagement of Dragon by Wake-Walker. In his defence, Wake-Walker pleaded inevitable accident, caused by the maneuvering of a third vessel, Saguenay Trader, which Wake-Walker was trying to avoid hitting.

The Admiralty action was heard by the Exchequer Court of Canada (Quebec Admiralty District), which held that Wake-Walker was liable. Wake-Walker appealed to the Supreme Court of Canada, which upheld the finding of liability on a 3-2 majority. Speaking for the majority, Justice Davis held that when a vessel under steam collides with a moored vessel, the commander of the vessel under steam is presumed liable for the collision, and has the onus of proving that he was not negligent. Wake-Walker had not done so. In addition, the trial judge had found actual fault by Wake-Walker in his navigation of Dragon and there was no basis to set aside that finding on appeal. Wake-Walker then appealed to the Judicial Committee of the Imperial Privy Council, at that time the highest court of appeal for the British Empire. That court dismissed the appeal. Speaking for the Judicial Committee, Viscount Sankey agreed with the courts below that Wake-Walker had not discharged the onus to prove that the accident had been inevitable.

World War II
Wake-Walker was first appointed was rear-admiral commanding the 12th Cruiser Squadron in September 1939. This appointment lasted only a short time as he soon returned to the Admiralty as head of a special group created to develop magnetic mine countermeasures.

In May 1940 Wake-Walker was appointed rear-admiral in command of all ships and vessels off the Franco-Belgian coast for the evacuation of Dunkirk. Wake-Walker reached Dunkirk in the minesweeper  on 30 May. On 1 June his flagship, the destroyer , was sunk by Ju 87 Stukas, and he thereafter directed operations from the motor torpedo boat MTB 102 in the harbour. For his role in the evacuation he was appointed Companion of the Bath.

Sinking Bismarck
In late May 1941, two of Wake-Walker's heavy cruisers –  and his flagship  - were positioned north west of Iceland to intercept and shadow the  if she attempted to break out into the Atlantic. Bismarck sortied from Bergen towards the Denmark Strait on 21 May in company with the heavy cruiser .

On 23 May 1941 at 19:22 Suffolk sighted Bismarck and Prinz Eugen. After a brief exchange of fire, the out-gunned British ships took cover in nearby fog and tracked the enemy by radar. They maintained contact with the two German ships through the night despite appalling weather, and successfully guided Vice-Admiral Lancelot Holland's two capital ships  and  into position to intercept Bismarck. The two forces came together in the Battle of the Denmark Strait the next day.

In the subsequent battle, Vice-Admiral Holland was killed when Hood was destroyed, and many of Prince of Waless senior officers were killed or wounded, which left Wake-Walker in command of the surviving ships, Norfolk, Suffolk and the damaged Prince of Wales. He decided not to risk continuing the battle and decided to continue to shadow the German ships, believing that Admiral John Tovey, with powerful elements of the Home Fleet, was approaching.

Wake-Walker stayed in the trail of Bismarck, but radar contact was lost early on 25 May. Wake-Walker sent Suffolk to search to the southwest, and thus she played no further role in the battle. However Norfolk turned east, and was at the final part of the battle, the following day.

Later, moves were made to court-martial Wake-Walker and Captain John Leach of Prince of Wales. The view was taken that they were wrong not to have continued the battle with Bismarck after Hood  had sunk. John Tovey, Commander-in-Chief of the Home Fleet, was appalled at this criticism. A row ensued between Tovey and his superior, Admiral Sir Dudley Pound. Tovey stated that the two officers had acted correctly, not endangering their ships needlessly and ensuring that the German ships were tracked. Tovey threatened to resign his position and appear at any court-martial as 'defendant's friend' and defence witness. No more was heard of the proposal. For his part in the destruction of Bismarck, Wake-Walker was appointed a Commander of the Order of the British Empire.

In 1943 Wake-Walker was appointed a Knight Commander of the Order of the Bath.

Personal life
Wake-Walker married Muriel Elsie Hughes (1890–1963), only daughter of Sir Collingwood Hughes of East Bergholt, Suffolk, at St Paul's Church, Knightsbridge, on 19 January 1916. They had two sons and two daughters, including the artist Penelope Hughes Wake-Walker (1917–2003), who married Sir Geoffrey Eley of East Bergholt, and Capt. Christopher Baldwin Hughes Wake-Walker (1920–1998), who married Lady Anne, daughter of the 7th Earl Spencer and aunt of Diana, Princess of Wales.

He died unexpectedly at his home in London on 24 September 1945 at the age of 57 and is buried in East Bergholt cemetery.

Notes

References

Notes

Bibliography
 
 
 

1888 births
1945 deaths
People from East Bergholt
People educated at Haileybury and Imperial Service College
Lords of the Admiralty
Royal Navy admirals of World War II
Companions of the Order of the Bath
Commanders of the Order of the British Empire
Royal Navy officers of World War I
Admiralty personnel of World War II